The Port Victoria P.V.1 was a British prototype floatplane fighter of the First World War, built at the Royal Naval Air Service's Port Victoria Marine Experimental Aircraft Depot on the Isle of Grain by fitting a Sopwith Baby with high-lift wings. Only a single aircraft was built, with the type not being chosen for production.

Design and development

Squadron-Commander J.W.Seddon RN, officer commanding of the Marine Experimental Aircraft Depot, realised that high-lift wings, as described by the National Physical Laboratory in 1916, had the potential to improve the lifting capacity of the Sopwith Baby seaplane. He instructed the Depot's Experimental Construction Depot to make and fit such wings to a Sopwith Baby, the resulting aircraft being named the P.V.1.

The new wings had the same area as the thinner aerofoils used on the Baby but were mounted with greater stagger; larger floats were also fitted. The thicker wings, heavier floats and additional 300 lb. (136 kg) ballast added a total of 600 lb. (272 kg) to the weight of the Baby, but the P.V.1 was still able to reach a height of 8,000 ft. (2,438 m) and achieve a speed of 67 kt (77 mph, 124 km/h).

While it successfully demonstrated the performance of the new high-lift wings, the Fairey Hamble Baby was placed in production instead.

The P.V.1 was retained by the Depot for test operation, including the investigation of the catapult launching of aircraft.

Specifications (P.V.1)

See also

References

Bruce, J.M. "The Sopwith Tabloid,Schneider and Baby: Historic Military Aircraft No.17 Part IV". Flight, 29 November 1957. pp. 845–848.

Floatplanes
1910s British fighter aircraft
PV1
Single-engined tractor aircraft
Rotary-engined aircraft
Biplanes
Aircraft first flown in 1916